Miron or Mirón may refer to:
 Miron (name)
 Miron (surname)
 El Mirón, a municipality in Ávila, Castile and León, Spain
 El Mirón Cave, in the upper Asón River valley, Cantabria, Spain
 17049 Miron, 1 minor planet

See also 
 Miron Costin (disambiguation)
 Collado del Mirón, a municipality in Ávila, Castile and León, Spain